Zohir Kedache (born 2 March 1986) is an Algerian boxer. He competed in the men's welterweight event at the 2016 Summer Olympics.

References

External links
 

1986 births
Living people
Algerian male boxers
Olympic boxers of Algeria
Boxers at the 2016 Summer Olympics
Place of birth missing (living people)
Welterweight boxers
21st-century Algerian people